Konstantin Rodofinikin (1760–1838), contemporarily known simply as Rodophinikin, was a Russian Imperial diplomat, agent in Revolutionary Serbia (1807–13), and member of the State Council.

He came from a Greek noble family, born on Rhodes. He served in the military, joining the Pereyaslav Cossack regiment in 1783, and then entered the Collegium of Commerce in 1786.

References

Diplomats of the Russian Empire
Politicians of the Russian Empire
19th-century people from the Russian Empire
People of the Serbian Revolution
Russian people of Greek descent
People from Rhodes
Greek emigrants to Russia
Greeks from the Ottoman Empire
1760 births
1838 deaths
Burials at the Dukhovskaya Church